B-MAC is a form of analog video encoding, specifically a type of Multiplexed Analogue Components (MAC) encoding.  MAC encoding was designed in the mid 80s for use with Direct Broadcast Satellite systems.  Other analog video encoding systems include NTSC, PAL and SECAM.  Unlike the FDM method used in those, MAC encoding uses a TDM method.  B-MAC was a proprietary MAC encoding used by Scientific-Atlanta for encrypting broadcast video services; the full name was "Multiple Analogue Component, Type B".

B-MAC uses teletext-style non-return-to-zero (NRZ) signaling with a capacity of 1.625 Mbit/s. The video and audio/data signals are therefore combined at baseband.
 Both PAL (626/50) and NTSC (525/60) versions of B-MAC were developed and used.

User base (PAL/NTSC zones)
 This system was used in South Africa and Australia (for TVRO until 2000).
 B-MAC was used for satellite broadcasts of the American Forces Radio and Television Service from the early 1980s until 1996-1997 when the analogue standard was replaced by the digital PowerVu system.
 B-MAC has not been used for DTH applications since Primestar switched to an all-digital delivery system in the mid-1990s.

Technical details 
MAC transmits luminance and chrominance data separately in time rather than separately in frequency (as other analog television formats do, such as composite video).

Audio and Scrambling (selective access)
 Audio, in a format similar to NICAM was transmitted digitally rather than as an FM subcarrier.
 The MAC standard included a standard scrambling system, EuroCrypt, a precursor to the standard DVB-CSA encryption system.

See also
 Analog high-definition television systems
 PAL, what MAC technology tried to replace
 SECAM, what MAC technology tried to replace
 A-MAC 
 B-MAC 
 C-MAC  
 D-MAC
 E-MAC
 S-MAC
 D2-MAC 
 HD-MAC, an early high-definition television standard allowing for 2048x1152 resolution.
 DVB-S, MAC technology was replaced by this standard
 DVB-T, MAC technology was replaced by this standard

References

External links
 Multiplexed Analogue Components in "Analog TV Broadcast Systems" by Paul Schlyter

Video formats
Television technology